Nicholas James Baxter (born 18 March 1971) is a male British sport shooter.

Sport shooting career
Baxter represented England at four consecutive Commonwealth Games in 1998, 2002, 2006 and 2010. The appearances resulted in the winning three gold medals, two silver medals and one bronze medal.

Two of the three gold medals came representing England at the 1998 Commonwealth Games in Kuala Lumpur, Malaysia, in the 10 metres air pistol pair and 50 metres free pistol pair.  Four years later he won a third gold in the 10 metres air pistol pair. All three golds were won while partnering Mick Gault.

External Links

References

1971 births
Living people
British male sport shooters
Commonwealth Games medallists in shooting
Commonwealth Games gold medallists for England
Commonwealth Games silver medallists for England
Commonwealth Games bronze medallists for England
Shooters at the 1998 Commonwealth Games
Shooters at the 2002 Commonwealth Games
Shooters at the 2006 Commonwealth Games
Shooters at the 2010 Commonwealth Games
20th-century British people
21st-century British people
Medallists at the 1998 Commonwealth Games
Medallists at the 2002 Commonwealth Games
Medallists at the 2006 Commonwealth Games
Medallists at the 2010 Commonwealth Games